"Overcome" is a song written and performed by Creed. At the time of its release, it was their first single since 2002 and the first from their 2009 reunion album, Full Circle. To date, it is their 11th song to reach the top five on the Billboard Mainstream Rock chart.

Lyrics
"Overcome" was said to be written in reference to an event where rapper T.I. had saved Creed lead singer Scott Stapp from committing suicide, but Stapp said in Loudwires Wikipedia: Fact or Fiction interview that it was actually about his desire to overcome the struggles and the demons that he had been fighting for many years. In his uncensored memoir, "Sinner's Creed", the full story of this so-called "suicide attempt" is written in great detail.

Music video
The music video was shot at their concert on August 18, 2009, at the Xfinity Center in Mansfield, Massachusetts and premiered on Tuesday, September 15, 2009, on Yahoo Music, one day earlier than expected. It is only the second non-conceptual Creed video (the first being "Higher") and contains not only live footage but also candid shots of the band backstage.

Release and reception
"Overcome" premiered on Creed's website on August 19, 2009, and was released for digital download on August 25, 2009, as the lead single to Full Circle, and the band's first single since 2002's "Weathered". It debuted at number 18 on the Billboard Mainstream Rock Tracks chart, peaking at number 4. It also reached number 73 on the Billboard Hot 100.

Charts

Weekly charts

Year-end charts

References

2009 songs
2009 singles
Creed (band) songs
Songs written by Mark Tremonti
Songs written by Scott Stapp
Wind-up Records singles
Alternative metal songs